The 1981–82 Auburn Tigers men's basketball team represented Auburn University in the 1981-82 college basketball season. The team was coached by Sonny Smith, who was in his fourth season.

The Tigers' key signee was freshman Charles Barkley from Leeds High School in Birmingham, Alabama.  Other key newcomers were junior college transfers Odell Mostellar and .Earl Hayes

The team played their home games at Memorial Coliseum in Auburn, Alabama. They finished the season 14-14, 7–11 in SEC play. The team advanced to the second round of the 1982 SEC Men's Basketball Tournament, where they lost to Kentucky.

Roster

Schedule and results

|-
!colspan=9 style=| Regular season

References

Auburn Tigers men's basketball seasons
Auburn
Auburn Tigers
Auburn Tigers